Pushkin is a station of the Tashkent Metro on Chilonzor Line. This station is named after poet Alexander Pushkin. It was opened on 18 August 1980 as part of the second section of Chilonzor Line, between October inkilobi and Maksim Gor'kiy.

References

Tashkent Metro stations
Railway stations opened in 1980